Chand Mal Lodha (18 July 1918 – 28 January 2012) was a chief justice of the Rajasthan High Court and the Guwahati High Court.

He was born in 1918 at Jodhpur in Rajasthan, and graduated as a gold medalist LLB from Allahabad in 1940.  He was appointed judge of the Rajasthan High Court in 1967 and later became chief justice of the Guwahati High Court in 1978.

References 
Rajasthan High Court website former chief justices
Chand Mal Lodha winning an award in 2003
Chand Mal Lodha's obituary

20th-century Indian judges
Rajasthani people
People from Jodhpur
1918 births
2012 deaths
Chief Justices of the Rajasthan High Court
Chief Justices of the Gauhati High Court